In mathematical optimization, the Ackley function is a non-convex function used as a performance test problem for optimization algorithms. It was proposed by David Ackley in his 1987 PhD dissertation.

On a 2-dimensional domain it is defined by:

 

Its global optimum point is

See also 
Test functions for optimization

Notes

Mathematical optimization